Anu Põder (17 November 1947 – 17 January 2013) was an Estonian visual artist. 

Põder was born in Kanepi. She graduated from Tartu 8th Secondary School (now, the Tartu Forseliuse School) in 1967, then enrolled at the Tartu Art College later that year before leaving in 1970 to study sculpture at the Estonian National Art Institute, graduating in 1976.

From In 1976 until 1988, she was a freelance artist and from 1988 until 1989, she was a teacher of form studies at Secondary School No. 46 in Tallinn. In 1989, she began working as an art teacher at the Tallinn Art School, leaving in 1993 for a position as a teacher of form at the Estonian Academy of Arts. In 1998, she began working as a teacher of form at the College of Applied Arts of the Estonian Academy of Arts, and in-service teacher training courses. Since 1999, she worked as a teacher at the EAA Teacher Training Centre.

Work by Põder is in the collection of the Tate Modern and the Art Museum of Estonia. International recognition for Põder did not come until after the exhibition Anu Põder: Be Fragile! Be Brave, curated by Rebeka Põldsam for the Kumu.

Anu Põder died in Tallinn, aged 65.

References 

1947 births
2013 deaths
20th-century Estonian sculptors
Estonian Academy of Arts alumni
Academic staff of the Estonian Academy of Arts
People from Kanepi Parish